Voetbalvereniging De Bataven is a football club from Gendt, Netherlands. VV De Bataven plays in the 2017–18 Sunday Hoofdklasse A.

References

External links
 Official site

Football clubs in the Netherlands
Football clubs in Lingewaard
Association football clubs established in 1932
1932 establishments in the Netherlands